José Bustamante may refer to:
José Bustamante (footballer, born 1907)
José Bustamante (footballer, born 1921)
José Bustamante (footballer, born 2000)